Ruby is a settlement on the island of Saint Croix in the United States Virgin Islands.

References

Populated places in Saint Croix, U.S. Virgin Islands